Kad suza ne bude... is the debut studio album by Bosnian pop-folk singer Selma Bajrami. It was released through the production company Nimfa Sound in 1998.

Background
Bajrami first began singing in kafanas . She was signed to the label Nimfa Sound and recorded her first album while still a teenager. The album was recorded in Belgrade and was, for the most part, written and composed by Milić Vukašinović.

Track listing

Personnel

Instruments

Milić Vukašinović – guitar
Slavko Kuzmanović – keyboards, accordion

Production and recording

Milić Vukašinović – arrangement, producing
Rade Ercegovac – mixing
Siniša Radović – producing
Mirko Pavić – executive producing

References

1998 albums
Selma Bajrami albums
Nimfa Sound albums